is a national highway connecting Shima, Mie and Kihoku, Mie in Japan.

Route description
Length: 115.5 km (72 mi)
Origin: Shima (in front of Kashikojima Station)
Terminus: Kihoku (at the crossing with Route 42)

Passes through
Mie Prefecture
Shima • Minami-Ise • Taiki • Kihoku

Intersects with

Mie Prefecture
Route 167
Route 422
Route 42

References

260
Roads in Mie Prefecture